Fakhreddine Ben Youssef (born 23 June 1991) is a Tunisian footballer, who currently plays for Pyramids F.C. He plays for the Tunisian national team as a striker.

Club career
Ben Youssef started his career playing for CS Sfaxien, in which he was loaned out to Metz. He then played for ES Tunis, before joining Saudi club Al-Ettifaq. He later had chosen to terminate his contract with his team Al-Ettifaq. In January 2020, he joined Egyptian club Al-Ismaily, then he rejoined them in November after being a free agent since summer, before moving to the newly founded Pyramids FC in 2021.

International career
Ben Youssef was a member of the Tunisian squad at the 2013 Africa Cup of Nations.

In June 2018, he was named in Tunisia’s 23-man squad for the 2018 FIFA World Cup in Russia. He scored an equalizer in Tunisia's last group stage match against Panama. This goal was the 2,500th goal in FIFA World Cup history.

Career statistics

Club

International

International goals
Scores and results list Tunisia's goal tally first.

References

External links

CSS.org.tn
fcmetz.com
e-s-tunis.com 

1991 births
Living people
Footballers from Tunis
Association football wingers
Tunisian footballers
Tunisia international footballers
2013 Africa Cup of Nations players
Tunisian expatriate sportspeople in Saudi Arabia
CS Sfaxien players
FC Metz players
Espérance Sportive de Tunis players
Tunisian Ligue Professionnelle 1 players
Ligue 1 players
Championnat National 2 players
Saudi Professional League players
Egyptian Premier League players
Ettifaq FC players
Ismaily SC players
Tunisian expatriate footballers
Expatriate footballers in France
Expatriate footballers in Saudi Arabia
Expatriate footballers in Egypt
Tunisian expatriate sportspeople in France
Tunisian expatriate sportspeople in Egypt
2018 FIFA World Cup players